Athlone Park is a small coastal suburb located between Durban and Amanzimtoti in KwaZulu-Natal, South Africa.

Geography 
Athlone Park lies on the mouth of the uMbokodweni River, approximately 19 km south of Durban and 7 km north of Amanzimtoti's CBD.

Organisationally and administratively, it is included in the eThekwini Metropolitan Municipality as a Southern Suburb and also forms the southernmost part of the South Durban Basin, the industrial and suburban subregion south of Durban.

Athlone Park is bordered by Prospecton to the north, Lotus Park to the north-west, Umbogintwini to the west, Amanzimtoti to the south and the Indian Ocean to the east.

Transport 
The N2 highway runs past Athlone Park bordering it to the west, separating it from the suburb of Umbogintwini. The national highway links the suburb to Durban to the north and Amanzimtoti and Port Shepstone to the south. Access to Athlone Park from the N2 is obtained through the Dickens Road off-ramp (Exit 144). 

The R102 Kingsway (Andrew Zondo Road) runs along the coast bordering Athlone Park to the east. The regional route links the suburb to Amanzimtoti to the south and Prospecton to the north.

References

 

Suburbs of Durban